The cross-strait charters are special flights between Taiwan and Mainland China, across the Taiwan Strait. After the Chinese Civil War, no direct flights were allowed between Taiwan and Mainland China due to mistrust and security concerns; this remained the case until 2003. Passengers had to transfer in a third city, such as Hong Kong, to complete their trip.

For the years 2003 and 2005, the scheme was restricted for the Chinese New Year period, so it was then called the Lunar New Year cross-strait charter in Taiwan, and the charter for Taiwan residents in Mainland China. For these years, the scheme was restricted for Taiwanese businessmen and their family members (excluding students and tourists) who are in Mainland China to travel to and from Taiwan.

In 2006, the service was opened to all residents of Taiwan for the first time. From the Mid-Autumn Festival on 2006, the valid period of the agreement was expanded to four main Chinese festivals: Qingming Festival, Dragon Boat Festival, Mid-Autumn Festival, and the original Chinese New Year.

In July 2008, charter flights expanded to weekends. Flight restrictions on nationalities were removed and Mainland China residents as well as foreign citizens were able to take the flights.

In November 2008, flights became daily instead only for the weekends. 108 weekly flights were established and the planes no longer had to travel through Hong Kong airspace, cutting travel times by two thirds in some cases such as flying from Taipei to Shanghai.

In April 2009, a new agreement was reached to allow cross-strait flights to become regularly scheduled instead of chartered. The cap on the flights was also raised to 270 flights per week, effective 31 August 2009. On 22 May 2010, another 100 additional weekly flights were permitted to be operated effective 14 June 2010, and Shanghai Hongqiao International Airport and Shijiazhuang Airport were added to the list of allowed destinations.

Background
There was no official contact for over 50 years between the governments of Taiwan — where the Kuomintang (KMT) had retreated — and Mainland China since the Communist Party of China established the People's Republic of China in 1949, after the Chinese Civil War. However, when the Chinese Economic Reform began welcoming foreign funds in the 1980s, Mainland China sought greater contact with Taiwan. Chiang Ching-kuo refused, beginning a policy of "Three Noes". The Three Noes policy was abandoned, however, when a flight bound for Taiwan was hijacked and Taiwan was forced to negotiate with Mainland China, beginning a series of negotiations. Merchants started investing in Mainland China and people visited their relatives. Air traffic between Taiwan and Mainland China grew dramatically, but no direct flights were allowed. Passengers traveling to Mainland China had to travel via an intermediate destination such as Hong Kong or Macau, or via South Korea and Japan. The travel time usually took more than a half day, especially during the holidays such as the Spring Festival.

In the 1990s, the government of Mainland China proposed the 'three direct links' - including direct air flights between Mainland China and Taiwan - to ease the travel problem.  However, Taiwanese government rejected this idea.

In 2002, Taiwan legislator John Chiang proposed that there should be special charters across the strait, and received support from the public and the aviation industry in Taiwan.

The talks
The previous regime of negotiations via the Straits Exchange Foundation and the Association for Relations Across the Taiwan Straits had broken down by the time Chen Shui-bian came to office. A political impasse prevented the resumption of semi-official dialogue, because the People's Republic of China government insisted on the recognition of the one China principle or the more ambiguous 1992 consensus as the basis for the talks. By contrast, the Republic of China government under Chen Shui-bian did not recognise the one China principle and repudiated the 1992 consensus reached under the previous administration. As a result, aviation industry bodies were accredited by the respective governments to negotiate only on the technical and operational aspects of the charter flights.

The governmental bodies politically responsible for the talks were the ROC Affairs Office of the State Council of the People's Republic of China, led by Chen Yunlin.

From 2000 to 2008, progress of talks were often severely affected by the political climate in Taiwan. After the re-election of the Chen Shui-bian government in 2004, the talks for the 2004 Chinese New Year charter flights were aborted when the PRC government was offended by Chen's independence-leaning rhetoric talks.

Aviation industry
Aviation companies operated at a huge loss for the 2003 charter flights due to the fact that all passengers could only travel one-way - that is, the flights traveled with no passengers for half the journey. Moreover, due to complicated procedures set out in the talks, the aviation companies could not hold direct-flights and had to travel through Hong Kong or Macau, greatly increasing their cost.  Nonetheless, the aviation companies were glad to provide the services, in part due to the historical nature and in part due to the possible promotional benefits from participating in the events, which were widely reported by the media.

Reaction in Taiwan and in Mainland China
The Pan-Blue coalition, which led the talks from Taiwan, supported the charter flights. The majority Pan-Green coalition, however, saw it as "step towards reunification" which Taiwanese people do not prefer and criticized the Pan-Blue coalition for holding talks with the PRC without government permissions. The Taiwanese public at large, and especially the merchants who benefited the most, supported the charter flights, and the Pan-Blue coalition benefited from the positive response.

2003 Charters
Time Period: January 26 to February 10, 2003
Number of flights: 16
Passengers: ROC businesspersons only
Destinations: Shanghai <-> Taipei, Kaohsiung
Airlines: Six Taiwanese carriers
Number of Travelers: approximate 2600
Feature: One way only, with a mandatory stop-over

Events
October 27, 2002: ROC legislator John Chiang proposed The Project of Mainland Taiwanese Businesspeople Returning Home, the project of "the direct charter". He said that Taiwanese airliners should be allowed to carry merchants back to Taipei at certain times, between selected airports, during the Lunar New Year.
October 30, 2002: The Taiwan Affairs Office of the State Council stated their willingness to help Taiwan merchants return home. The PRC claimed the idea of equality and mutual benefit, hoping that PRC carriers could also provide services; however, the ROC government disagreed.
December 4, 2002: The ROC government established regulations for allowing ROC business people to return to Mainland China:
Only ROC operators could fly the routes during the Chinese New Year as a charter.
Flights may only originate in Taipei's Chiang Kai-shek International Airport (Taiwan Taoyuan International Airport) and Kaohsiung International Airport, and may only arrive in Shanghai Hongqiao International Airport or Shanghai Pudong International Airport.
Charters must have at least one stopover in either Hong Kong or Macau, with no traffic between the stopover and both Taiwan and Mainland China cities.
Passengers may only be merchants and their families.
Between late 2002 to early 2003, six Taiwanese airlines applied to run the charters.
On January 26, 2003, at 3:55am, China Airlines flight 585 operated with a Boeing 747 departed from Chiang Kai-shek International Airport of Taipei. The crew consisted of pilots Zhang Yisong and Chen Beibei on board.  After a stop in Hong Kong, the aircraft landed successfully at Shanghai Pudong International Airport at 8:52am, and became the first legal Taiwanese aircraft to land in Mainland China for more than 54 years.
On 11:15am, a China Airlines flight carrying 222 passengers took off from Pudong International Airport and arrived at Taiwan Taoyuan International Airport at 3:40am with a short stop in Hong Kong.
On the same day, TransAsia Airways flight 386, an Airbus A320, left Taipei with no passengers at 8:20, and reached Shanghai at 12:40pm via Macau. The return flight with 137 passengers departed Shanghai at 2pm, and arrived Kaohsiung at 6:15 with a stopover in Macau.
On February 9, China Airlines flight 585 was the last flight of the 2003 Lunar New Year charter services. The flight arrived with 237 travelers on board in Pudong International Airport at 11:14pm the same day.

The period of 16 charter flights occurred between January 26 and February 9, 2003.

Flight record

Flight details
China Airlines (CAL) operated the first flight. Due to the one-way-only service restriction, only the crew,  securities of the Ministry of Transportation and Communications (ROC side), two officers of the Mainland Affairs Council, and 14 CAL staff were on board the  Taipei-Shanghai section for the first flights ceremony.
After coming to a complete standstill, staff at Pudong International Airport showed a huge red banner with the words "" (Ardently welcome CAL's First charter flight to Shanghai). A "Lion Dance" show was held.
CAL Chief executive officer Wei, Philip Hsing-Hsiung (present Chairman) and crew waved their hands in greeting when stepping out the aircraft.
Due to the sensitive state and the problem on using the Taiwan Compatriot Pass, the vice secretary of the Mainland Affairs Council, Zhi-Hong Jam() did not attend the celebration but stayed in the aircraft after a short salutation.
At C.K.S. International Airport, Taipei, CAL arranged a small ceremony to salute the first passengers. Then CAL Chairman Lee, Yun-Ning said "It's better to have direct flight as soon as possible. It's better to have it from tomorrow."
The greeting ceremony was different in Kaohsiung. Numerous police were inside the terminal waiting for TransAsia's flight back to Kaohsiung.

2005 Charters
Time Period: January 26 to February 20, 2005
Number of flights: 48
Passengers: Mainly businesspeople, some tourists and overseas students
Destinations: Beijing, Shanghai, Guangzhou <-> Taipei, Kaohsiung
Airlines: Six Taiwanese carriers and six Chinese airlines
Number of travelers: more than 10,000
Features: Both way available without any stopover

Events
There was no charter service in 2004 for several reasons, including the ROC presidential election in which the independence-leaning Pan-Green coalition was re-elected.
In December 2004, John Chiang expressed high expectations for the 2005 charter.
January 2, 2005, the spokesperson of The Taiwan Affairs Office of the State Council proclaimed that they do care for the accomplishment of 2005 charters. They also demanded that the services this time should be operated as round-trip, non-stop service by airlines of both side with an increased number of destinations. They suggested the civil airlines negotiate with each other on technical and operational problems.
January 9, 2005, Mission Animating the Tai-merchants Charters led by John Chiang arrived Beijing.
January 10, 2005, Chen Yunlin, minister of the Taiwan Affairs Office (PRC), delegate of the General Administration of Civil Aviation (PRC) met during the mission. Chen said he would urge to carry the air links into reality.
January 11, 2005, During the conference, the PRC aspect hoped the available airports could include Taichung. But the proposal was rejected by the ROC because Taichung Airport is an air force base. The ROC aspect hoped the destinations could be more than Beijing and original Shanghai, like Guangzhou, Xiamen, Chongqing, and Shenzhen. The ROC also wished that flights could fly through Okinawa Flight Information Region in order to reduce the unnecessarily lengthy flight time. The PRC refused the rearward in avoiding the charters being considered as international flights. They only permitted the flights go via the air space of Hong Kong and Macau.
January 15, the civil operators came to terms. The agreement is as follows,
Time Period: January 29~February 20, 2005.
Restricted destinations: Beijing, Shanghai, Guangzhou <-> Taipei, Kaohsiung
Airlines on both side could apply the charters to the related governmental departments on the opposite side. Charters would operated in the type of "Both-joining, directly non-stop, carrying passengers both ways (round-trip), and more dots (means destinations in Chinese) included".
Only Tai-merchants could take the flights.
Planes had to go through the Hong Kong Flight Information Region without landing.
Between January 29 and February 20, 2005, twelve mainland Chinese and Taiwanese airlines flew 48 charters.
At 7:46am on January 29, Air China Flight 1087 was the first flight to depart Mainland China with 88 passengers. China Airlines flight 581 was the first to depart Taiwan aircraft from Chiang Kai-shek International Airport in Taipei.
At 9:20am, China Southern Airlines Flight 3097, originating in Guangzhou, arrived Chiang Kai-Shek International Airport in Taipei. China Southern became the first airline landing Taiwan legally after the Chinese Civil War. The reason why the earliest-departed was not the earliest-arrived is that Guangzhou, which the city is located in the southern province of Guangdong, is far closer to Taiwan than the northern Beijing.
On February 20, the last charter of the year, Hainan Airlines flight 7952 arrived Beijing Capital International Airport at 9:30pm.

Flight records
The six mainland Chinese airlines originated in three cities in Mainland China: Beijing (Air China, Hainan Airlines), Shanghai (China Eastern Airlines), and Guangzhou (China Southern Airlines, Xiamen Airlines). All Air China's flight are operated by Shandong Airlines' aircraft to avoid Air China's livery which features the "Five Star Red Flag".

The Taiwanese airlines were the same as in 2003. Most Taiwanese flights departed for Guangzhou (TransAsia Airways), and Kaohsiung was mainly serviced by Uni Air.

One-Way/round-trip argument
As the charter flight was only for Taiwanese merchants returning home for the Chinese New Year, there would not be a demand to travel from Taiwan to Mainland China before the New Year's Day. Neither would there be people needing to travel on the flights from Mainland China to Taiwan that operated on dates after the New Year period.

In order to make sure the original purpose was not violated, in the 2003 case, the ROC government ensured that passengers could only travel one way, that meant no one was allowed to fly from Taiwan to Mainland China before the festival, and no one could travel on the return flight after the festival.

However, since the 2005 charters, the ROC government later approved of passengers traveling the entire round-trip though there were still other limits.

2006 Charters
Time span: January 20, 2006 to February 13, 2006
Number of flights: 36 flights in each direction, 72 flights in total
Main target: Taiwanese residents
Cities served: PRC -- Beijing, Shanghai, Guangzhou, Xiamen ; ROC -- Taipei, Kaohsiung
Airlines: 6 airline companies from ROC and PRC
PRC -- Air China, China Eastern Airlines, China Southern Airlines, Shanghai Airlines, Xiamen Airlines, Hainan Airlines
ROC -- China Airlines, Eva Air, Mandarin Airlines, Uni Air, TransAsia Airways, Far Eastern Air Transport
Number of passengers: To be tabulated
Features: Direct flights to and from Mainland China, passing through Hong Kong Flight Information Region

Events
November 18, 2005: Vice director-general of Cross-Straits Aviation Transport Exchange Council (海峡两岸航空运输交流委员会) Pu Zhaozhou said at the news conference of the Taiwan Affairs Office of the State Council that the plan for 2006 charters has been confirmed.
January 20, 2006: 07:06, China Airlines flight CI 585, the earliest-departed charter, took off at the Taipei Chiang Kai-Shek International Airport, and arrived Shanghai at around noon. The returning flight (same aircraft with new flight number - CI586) included a Taiwanese motor neurone disease patient, the 1960s singer Ye Ling (葉彩育). The ROC's Mainland Affairs Council also permitted two mainland Chinese paramedic to take the charter to assist the patient. This was also the first time for heavily injured people to be able to travel home directly across the strait for their treatment. China Airlines, especially for her, ripped six seats in a row with two left. The spare space was for her stretcher's settlement; this made Ye's way home comfortable. "My Wife couldn't make her way back to Taiwan if there had not been the charters!" her husband said appreciatively.
2006 was the first time for adding Xiamen to be a destination.

Flight details
Different from the great reactions in 2005, media and airlines took the 2006 one much less seriously. The airline operating the first-departed charter, China Airlines, did not hold any ceremony; it only saw the charter as a normal commercial flight. Quantity of news reports from both sides of the strait was less than the previous one. Only the Taiwanese Eastern Television and the mainland Chinese CCTV have had some reports on news programs.
Specially-designed aircraft was the focus of this year. Most airlines sent out their aircraft with special livery to fly the routes:
Air China used a Boeing 737-700 aircraft which registration number is B-5202 with logos and slogan, One World, One Dream, of 2008 Beijing Olympics on it.
EVA Air used an Airbus A330 aircraft, registration number B-16303, which has Hello Kitty characters painted on it. It flew the Taipei - Beijing route.
Hainan Airlines' "Happy Waves" (快樂海浪) special-painted plane operated the Beijing-Taipei flight, symbolizing the cheerful setting sail.
Far Eastern Air Transport flew to Xiamen with their painted plane "unlimited dignity", showing respect to all charter passengers.

2008 Humanitarian flights
Date: May 16, 2008

Airlines: EVA Air (Chongqing), China Airlines (Chongqing), TransAsia Airways (Chongqing), Mandarin Airlines (Chengdu)

Due to the Sichuan earthquake, many Taiwan travelers were unable to get flights out of the quake region. Both governments reached a deal and chartered four flights to depart from Chengdu and Chongqing to Taiwan on May 16, 2008.

2008 Charters

Under the agreement reached on June 13, 2008, charter flights began on weekends starting July 4, 2008. A total of 18 flights per weekend (Friday to Monday) are allowed under this agreement. Unlike previous charters, anyone with legal traveling documents, regardless of nationality, was allowed to travel on these charter flights. Initially, Mainland China permitted flights from Beijing, Shanghai (Pudong Airport), Guangzhou, Xiamen, and Nanjing airports, and the plan was to permit flights from Chengdu, Chongqing, Dalian, Guilin, Shenzhen, Shenyang, Xian and other spots with market demand in the future, while the ROC government permitted flights from Taiwan Taoyuan Airport, Taipei Songshan Airport, Kaohsiung, Taichung, Makung, Hualien, Kinmen, and Taitung.

On July 4, 2008, the first flight carrying 230 passengers belonging to China Southern Airlines arrived at Taoyuan International Airport.

Three Links
Started on 15 December 2008, direct flights, direct shippings and direct mail are fully restored between Mainland China and Taiwan per the Three Links agreement. It marks the end of cross-strait charter flights and marks the beginning of regular scheduled flights. Shanghai and Taipei Area Control Center can pass traffic to each other at SULEM (Waypoint in Aviation) in the northern flight path while no direct pass-off for southern flight path.

See also

Three Links
Political status of Taiwan
History of the Republic of China
Cross-Straits relations
Kuomintang

References

Aviation agreements
2003 in aviation
Cross-Strait relations